Ventry, officially Ceann Trá, is a Gaeltacht village in County Kerry, Ireland, on the Dingle Peninsula, 7 kilometres west of Dingle. Due to its long sandy beach, Ventry is a popular tourist destination. The town is connected to Dingle via the R559 regional road.

Six kilometres west of Ventry are the ruins of Dunbeg (An Dún Beag), an Iron Age promontory fort on the edge of a steep cliff. Near Dunbeg is Kilvickadownig, home to other archeological ruins, including examples of the beehive house and the grave of Caol or Cháil Mic Crimthainn, the last to die in the Battle of Ventry from the well-known Fenian Cycle myths.

A site of interest in Ventry parish is Rahinnane Castle, which was the residence of the Knight of Kerry. The Knight of Kerry lived there until Cromwellian times. The castle was built on the site of an old ringfort. The ringfort was built up and a second added with walls of six metres (20 feet), giving the appearance that there may have been a moat, although there never was one. Rahinnane Castle still has its very tiny, narrow, stone stairs, from the first to second floors, which can be carefully climbed.

Notable people
Ventry was home to Páidí Ó Sé, the well-known Kerry footballer, who owned a pub across from the parish church until his death in 2012. Canon James Goodman, the music collector and Professor of Irish at Trinity College, Dublin, was raised in Ventry.

Ventry Bay

The bay or harbour is a suitable anchorage for sailing and fishing boats. On 4 October 1939,  entered Ventry Bay and landed 28 Greek sailors of the MV Diamantis. Their ship had been torpedoed by a U-boat. The event was commemorated with a plaque in October 2009. Guests included the German Ambassador Dr. Busso von Alvensleben and the Mayor of the Oinousses Islands in the Aegean, Evangelos Elias Angelakos who unveiled the memorial stone  and members of London's Greek shipping community.

See also
 List of towns and villages in Ireland

References

External links
Dingle Peninsula Tourism: Ventry
Dingle Peninsula Visitor's Guide: Ventry
Greek freighter DIAMANTIS, sunk on 3 October 1939 by German U-Boat U-35
Live weather station: Ventry

Towns and villages in County Kerry
Bays of County Kerry
Beaches of County Kerry
Gaeltacht towns and villages
Gaeltacht places in County Kerry